The small-spotted lizard (Mesalina guttulata) is a species of lizard. It is found in the following countries: Morocco, Algeria, Tunisia, Libya, Egypt, Sinai, Israel, Saudi Arabia, Iran (Kavir desert), India, S. Turkmenistan, N. Africa, Afghanistan, Pakistan, 
Senegal, Niger, Sudan, Syria. Type locality: Egypt

References 

 Lichtenstein, M. Heinrich C. 1823 Verzeichniss der Doubletten des zoologischen Museums der Königl. Universität zu Berlin nebst Beschreibung vieler bisher unbekannter Arten von Säugethieren, Vögeln, Amphibien und Fischen. Königl. Preuss. Akad. Wiss./ T. Trautwein, Berlin. x, 118 pages

External links 
 https://web.archive.org/web/20060131020506/http://itgmv1.fzk.de/www/itg/uetz/herp/photos/Mesalina_guttulata.jpg
 

Mesalina
Lacertid lizards of Africa
Reptiles of Pakistan
Vertebrates of Egypt
Reptiles of North Africa
Reptiles of Central Asia
Fauna of South Asia
Fauna of the Sahara
Reptiles described in 1823
Taxa named by Hinrich Lichtenstein